"One Last Step" is a song recorded by Canadian country music artist Shirley Myers. It was released in 1998 as the third single from her debut album, Let It Rain. It peaked at number 9 on the RPM Country Tracks chart in June 1998.

Chart performance

Year-end charts

References

1997 songs
1998 singles
Shirley Myers songs
Songs written by Shirley Myers
Stony Plain Records singles